Nah'Shon "Bones" Hyland (born September 14, 2000) is an American professional basketball player for the Los Angeles Clippers of the National Basketball Association (NBA). He played college basketball for the VCU Rams before being drafted 26th overall in the 2021 NBA draft by the Nuggets.

Early life and high school career
Hyland was born in North Carolina. Hyland started playing basketball after watching his older brother and a friend playing at the park. He was nicknamed "Bizzy Bones" or "Bones" in part due to his slender build. Hyland attended St. Georges Technical High School in Middletown, Delaware. During his junior year, his 11-month-old cousin and grandmother died in a house fire. Hyland escaped by jumping from his second-floor bedroom and suffered a torn patellar tendon, sidelining him for six months. As a senior, he averaged 26.6 points, 6.6 rebounds, 4.6 assists and 3.4 steals per game, leading his team to the semifinals of the state tournament. He was named Delaware Player of the Year and earned first team All-State honors. A four-star recruit, he committed to playing college basketball for VCU over offers from Saint Joseph's, Rhode Island, La Salle, Boston College, UConn and Temple.

College career
On January 18, 2020, Hyland scored a freshman season-high 21 points and five three-pointers in a 91–63 win over St. Bonaventure. As a freshman, he averaged nine points, 2.2 rebounds and 1.8 assists per game, earning Atlantic 10 All-Rookie Team accolades. He shot 43.4 percent from three-point range and set a program freshman record with 63 three-pointers. In his sophomore season debut on November 25, Hyland scored 23 points, making five three-pointers, in an 85–69 victory over Utah State. On December 9, he scored 30 points, shooting 7-of-12 from three-point range, in a 95–59 win over North Carolina A&T. Six days later, Hyland posted a career-high 31 points in a 93–68 victory over Western Carolina. On March 5, 2021, he recorded 30 points and 10 rebounds in a 73–68 win against Dayton at the Atlantic 10 tournament quarterfinals. As a sophomore, Hyland averaged 19.5 points, 4.7 rebounds, 2.1 assists and 1.9 steals per game, and was named Atlantic 10 Player of the Year. On April 17, 2021, he declared for the 2021 NBA draft, forgoing his remaining college eligibility.

Professional career

Denver Nuggets (2021–2023)
On July 29, 2021, Hyland was drafted with the 26th overall pick in the 2021 NBA draft by the Denver Nuggets, becoming VCU's first draft pick in 11 years. On January 15, 2022, Hyland scored a career-high 27 points and had 10 rebounds in a 133–96 win against the Los Angeles Lakers. On April 24, in the first round of the playoffs, Hyland helped the Nuggets to a 126–121 Game 4 victory over the Golden State Warriors, with 15 points and 7 assists.

Los Angeles Clippers (2023–present) 
On February 9, 2023, Hyland was traded to the Los Angeles Clippers in a four-team trade involving the Los Angeles Lakers and Orlando Magic.

Career statistics

NBA

Regular season

|-
| style="text-align:left;"|
| style="text-align:left;"|Denver
| 69 || 4 || 19.0 || .403 || .366 || .856 || 2.7 || 2.8 || .6 || .3 || 10.1
|-
| style="text-align:left;"|
| style="text-align:left;"|Denver
| 42 || 1 || 19.5 || .399 || .378 || .866 || 2.0 || 3.0 || .7 || .3 || 12.1
|- class="sortbottom"
| style="text-align:center;" colspan="2"|Career
| 111 || 5 || 19.2 || .401 || .371 || .860 || 2.5 || 2.8 || .6 || .3 || 10.9

Playoffs

|-
| style="text-align:left;"|2022
| style="text-align:left;"|Denver
| 5 || 0 || 17.4 || .361 || .348 || .857 || 2.0 || 3.2 || .2 || .0 || 9.2
|- class="sortbottom"
| style="text-align:center;" colspan="2"|Career
| 5 || 0 || 17.4 || .361 || .348 || .857 || 2.0 || 3.2 || .2 || .0 || 9.2

College

|-
| style="text-align:left;"| 2019–20
| style="text-align:left;"| VCU
| 31 || 9 || 20.6 || .433 || .434 || .667 || 2.2 || 1.8 || .8 || .3 || 9.0
|-
| style="text-align:left;"| 2020–21
| style="text-align:left;"| VCU
| 24 || 24 || 31.9 || .447 || .371 || .862 || 4.7 || 2.1 || 1.9 || .2 || 19.5
|- class="sortbottom"
| style="text-align:center;" colspan="2"| Career
| 55 || 33 || 25.5 || .441 || .399 || .827 || 3.3 || 1.9 || 1.3 || .3 || 13.6

References

External links
VCU Rams bio

2000 births
Living people
21st-century African-American sportspeople
African-American basketball players
American men's basketball players
Basketball players from Wilmington, Delaware
Denver Nuggets draft picks
Denver Nuggets players
Point guards
VCU Rams men's basketball players